Ryan Anthony Guillen (born October 27, 1977) is an American politician serving as the Texas State Representative for House District 31, which includes Starr, Atascosa, Duval, Brooks, Jim Hogg, Kenedy, La Salle, Live Oak, McMullen and  Willacy counties. A native of Starr County, Guillen was first elected in 2002 at the age of 24, making him one of the youngest ever elected to the Texas House of Representatives. He continues to serve Texas and is in his 10th term as a Representative.

Originally elected as a Democrat, Guillen formally switched parties and became a Republican on November 15, 2021.

Early life and career

Ryan Anthony Guillen was born in College Station, Texas, the same city Texas A&M University resides, and where his parents attended college. While Ryan was still an infant, his family would move back to their home town of Rio Grande City. It was in Rio Grande City Guillen was raised and where he attended school with his future wife, Dalinda. Ryan attended public and private schools in Rio Grande City and later both graduated from Texas A&M University. Guillen was a rancher, educator, and small businessman in Starr County when he was elected to the Texas legislature. Guillen and his wife have two children.

Texas State Legislature

Representative Guillen took office in January 2003, following his election in 2002. He has been reelected seven times. He is currently serving his eighth consecutive term in the Texas Legislature, including eight regular sessions and eight special sessions.  During this time he has served on several committees.

During the 78th Legislative Session, Guillen served on the Select Election Contests Committee, the Land and Resource Management Committee, the Select Public School Finance Committee, and the Regulated Industries Committee.

In the 79th Legislative Session, Guillen served on the Appropriations Committee, which constructs the state's budget.  He also served as a member of the Appropriations Select Committee on Education, the Select Committee on Election Contests, and served as Budget and Oversight Chair of the Financial Institutions Committee.

In the 80th Legislative Session, Guillen served as Vice Chair of the Appropriations Committee, the Natural Resources Committee and the Calendars Committee which chooses the bills that will be heard for debate. He also served on the Select Committee on Higher and Public Education Finance.

In the 81st Legislative Session, Guillen served on the Border and Intergovernmental Affairs Committee, the Oversight of Windstorm Insurance Committee, the Transportation Committee and the Select Committee on Transportation Funding.

In the 82nd Legislative session, Guillen served as Chairman of the Committee on Culture, Recreation and Tourism, holding that position through the 84th Committee.  He also served as a member of the Public Education Committee, the Oversight of Windstorm Insurance Committee, and the  Select Election Contest Committee.

In the 85th Legislative session, Guillen served as the vice-chairman of the Licensing and Administrative Procedures Committee. He also served as a member of the State Affairs Committee.

Committee assignments

Representative Guillen has been on several important House committees throughout his political career. He was appointed Vice Chairman of the Appropriations Committee in his second term. He has served on the following committees throughout his tenure.

78th Session
•	Election Contests, Select
•	Land and Resource Management
•	Public School Finance, Select
•	Regulated Industries

79th Session
•	Appropriations
•	Education, Select
•	Election Contests, Select
•	Financial Institutions (Budget and Oversight Chair)

80th Session
•	Appropriations (Vice Chairman)
•	Natural Resources
•	Calendars
•	Higher and Public Education Finance, Select

81st Session
•	Border and Intergovernmental Affairs
•	Oversight of Windstorm Insurance
•	Transportation
•	Transportation, Select

82nd Session
•	Culture, Recreation and Tourism (chair)
•	Public Education
•	Oversight of Windstorm Insurance
•	Election Contest, Select

83rd Session
•	Culture, Recreation and Tourism (chair)
•	Licensing and Administrative Procedures
•	Study Water Desalination (Joint Interim)

84th Session
•	Culture, Recreation and Tourism (chair)
•	Licensing and Administrative Procedures

85th Session
•	Licensing and Administrative Procedures (Vice Chair)
•	State Affairs

86th Session
•	Resolutions Calendars (chair)
•	Ways and Means (Vice Chair)
•	Licensing and Administrative Procedures

87th Session
•	Resolutions Calendars (chair)
•	Agriculture & Livestock
•	Licensing and Administrative Procedures
•   Redistricting

Election history

General Election 2012: HD 31

General Election 2010: HD 31

General Election 2008: HD 31

General Election 2006: HD 31

General Election 2004: HD 31

General Election 2002: HD 31

Democratic Primary Runoff Election 2002: HD 31

Democratic Primary Election 2002: HD 31

References

External links
Ryan Guillen's Official State Profile

Living people
American politicians of Mexican descent
Members of the Texas House of Representatives
Texas Democrats
Texas Republicans
People from Rio Grande City, Texas
1977 births
21st-century American politicians
People from Brazos County, Texas
Hispanic and Latino American state legislators in Texas